Damon Mirani (born 13 May 1996) is a Dutch professional footballer who plays as a centre-back for Eredivisie club Volendam.

Club career

Ajax
Mirani began his football career in the under-8 of VV Monnickendam before moving to Volendam. At the end of the 2011–12 season, he was admitted to the Ajax academy. On 15 March 2013, he signed his first professional contract with the club, binding him to the club until 30 June 2016. At the end of the 2012–13 season, Mirani was crowned Talent van De Toekomst (Talent of the Future) while playing for Ajax B1, the under-17 team.

Mirani began the 2013–14 season playing for Ajax A1, the under-19 team. With the unavailability of several players, he made his professional debut for Jong Ajax against Achilles '29 in an Eerste Divisie match on 8 September 2013, coming on for Tom Noordhoff as a half-time substitute. On 28 June 2014, Mirani made his unofficial debut for the Ajax first team in a friendly against SDC Putten which was won 13–1. Mirani replaced Kenny Tete after the break and scored the 7–0 from a corner-kick in the 50th minute.

In March 2016, it was announced that Mirani's expiring contract would not be extended, which meant that he could start looking for a new club. Mirani made a total of 24 appearances for Jong Ajax in three seasons, and failed to make his official first-team debut.

Almere City
On 31 May 2016, Mirani signed a two-year contract with Eerste Divisie club Almere City. He made his official debut for Almere City on 5 August in an away match against Volendam. The match ended in a 1–1 draw.

Volendam
On 15 June 2021, Mirani moved to Volendam on a two-year contract, a club where he already worked part-time as a youth coach.

Career statistics

Honours
Individual
Ajax Talent of the Future: 2012–13

References

External links
 Netherlands stats at OnsOranje
 
 

1996 births
Living people
Dutch footballers
Association football defenders
People from Monnickendam
VV Monnickendam players
Jong Ajax players
AFC Ajax players
Almere City FC players
FC Volendam players
Eerste Divisie players
Eredivisie players
Netherlands youth international footballers
Footballers from North Holland